Jacarra Winchester is an American freestyle wrestler. She won the gold medal in the women's 55 kg event at the 2019 World Wrestling Championships and the 2021 Pan American Wrestling Championships. She also represented the United States at the 2020 Summer Olympics in Tokyo, Japan.

College career
She competed for Missouri Valley College in college.

2018 season
Winchester competed at the 2018 World Wrestling Championships, where she finished 5th.

2019 season
She won gold at the 2019 World Wrestling Championships at 55 kg.  She entered the tournament as the third seed.  Her victory was part of a record result for the United States, with the women's freestyle team winning three gold medals for the first time.

2022 season
In 2022, she won the gold medal in the 55 kg event at the Yasar Dogu Tournament held in Istanbul, Turkey. She lost her bronze medal match in the 55kg event at the 2022 World Wrestling Championships held in Belgrade, Serbia.

References

External links
 
 
 
 

Living people
American female sport wrestlers
World Wrestling Championships medalists
Pan American Wrestling Championships medalists
Wrestlers at the 2020 Summer Olympics
1992 births
Olympic wrestlers of the United States
21st-century American women